Baurubatrachus is an extinct genus of prehistoric frogs found in the Maastrichtian Marília Formation of Brazil, formerly considered to be related to the extant family Ceratophryidae. However, a detailed assessment of the anatomy and relationships of the single known fossil of Baurubatrachus demonstrated that it is not part of Ceratophryidae and might be part of a much ancient group of Neobatrachia.

Discovery and species
The type species of the genus, B. pricei, was found in the Serra da Galga Formation (formerly called the Serra da Galga Member of the Marília Formation), near Peirópolis (Minas Gerais, Brazil), 200 km north of Catanduva City. A second species, B. santosdoroi, was described in 2022 and the remains of two individuals were discovered in the Adamantina Formation cropping out near Catanduva city, São Paulo, Brazil.

See also 
 Prehistoric amphibian
 List of prehistoric amphibians

References 

Cretaceous frogs
Late Cretaceous amphibians
Cretaceous amphibians of South America
Maastrichtian life
Fossils of Brazil
Marília Formation
Fossil taxa described in 1990